Jesse Matthew Furman (born June 7, 1972) is a United States district judge of the United States District Court for the Southern District of New York.

Early life and education 
Furman is the son of psychologist Gail (née Gorman) and real estate developer Jay Furman. He earned a Bachelor of Arts from Harvard College in 1994 and then was a Henry Fellow at Oxford University from 1994 until 1995. He received a Juris Doctor from Yale Law School in 1998. From 1998 until 1999, Furman served as a law clerk for then United States District Judge and future United States Attorney General Michael Mukasey. In 1999–2000 he clerked for United States Court of Appeals for the Second Circuit Judge José A. Cabranes, and in 2002–03 for Associate Justice David Souter.

Professional career 

Furman worked as a lawyer at the law firm Wiggin & Dana from 2000 to 2002 and again from 2003 to 2004. In 2004, he became a federal prosecutor in the Southern District of New York, where he served as an Assistant United States Attorney. From 2007 to 2009, he worked in the office of the United States Attorney General as Counselor to the Attorney General. A 2005 New York Observer article named him as a potential future Supreme Court nominee.

Federal judicial service 

On June 7, 2011, President Barack Obama nominated Furman to a seat on the United States District Court for the Southern District of New York that had been vacated by Judge Alvin Hellerstein, who had taken senior status in January 2011. On September 15, 2011, the Senate Judiciary Committee reported his nomination to the Senate floor by a voice vote. On February 15, 2012, Senate Majority Leader Harry Reid filed cloture on Furman's nomination. On February 16, the Senate, by unanimous consent, vitiated the cloture vote on the nomination and agreed to a final vote on the nomination. On February 17, the Senate confirmed Furman by a 62–34 vote. He received his commission the same day.

Notable cases

On March 24, 2018, United States Secretary of Commerce Wilbur Ross announced his decision to add a question about citizenship status to the 2020 Census questionnaire, asserting that it was necessary to help the Justice Department enforce the Voting Rights Act of 1965. Two groups of plaintiffs filed lawsuits in the United States District Court for the Southern District of New York to block the question. The cases were assigned to Furman, who rejected the plaintiffs' claim that adding the question violated the Enumeration Clause of the U.S. Constitution but held that Ross's decision violated the Administrative Procedure Act and that the Voting-Rights-Act-enforcement rationale was a pretext designed to conceal the true reasons for adding the question. Furman entered an order blocking implementation of Ross's decision. On June 27, 2019, the Supreme Court affirmed Furman's order, agreeing that the Voting-Rights-Act-enforcement rationale was pretextual. The Court's decision left open the possibility that Ross could try again to add the citizenship question to the 2020 Census, but the Trump administration did not make a second attempt.

Personal 
Furman is married to Ariela Dubler a former Columbia Law School professor who now heads the Abraham Joshua Heschel School. His brother Jason Furman served as an economic adviser to President Obama. Furman is Jewish.

See also 
 List of Jewish American jurists
 List of law clerks of the Supreme Court of the United States (Seat 3)
 List of lawsuits involving Donald Trump

References

External links 

1972 births
Harvard College alumni
Judges of the United States District Court for the Southern District of New York
Law clerks of the Supreme Court of the United States
Living people
United States district court judges appointed by Barack Obama
21st-century American judges
Yale Law School alumni
Assistant United States Attorneys
20th-century American Jews
21st-century American Jews